Bătrâna may refer to the following places in Romania:

Bătrâna, a commune in Hunedoara County
Bătrâna, a tributary of the Bâlta in Gorj County
Bătrâna, an alternative name of the river Valea Boului in Buzău and Brăila Counties
Bătrâna, a name for the upper course of the Dobra in Hunedoara County
Bătrâna (Someșul Cald), a tributary of the Someșul Cald in Bihor and Cluj Counties
Bătrâna (Râul Târgului), a tributary of the Râul Târgului in Argeș County
Bătrâna, a tributary of the Sadu in Sibiu County

See also 
 Bătrânești (disambiguation)